The 2007 Vojko Herksel Cup was the 2nd Vojko Herksel Cup whose groups were held which took place at several venues across ex-Yugoslavia. In the Vojko Herksel Cup played 10 teams. Šibenik, a past winner of seasonal regional league, is secured directly to the final tournament, while the remaining 9 teams were divided into 3 groups, whose winners have secured the final tournament. The final tournament was held in Bijelo Polje in Hall Nikoljac.

Groups

Group A

Group B

Group C

Final tournament

References

Vojko Herksel Cup
2007–08 in European women's basketball
2007–08 in Croatian basketball